Oru Minnaminunginte Nurunguvettam is a 1987 Malayalam-language drama film directed by Bharathan, written by John Paul and produced by M. G. Gopinath and Babu Thiruvalla. The film stars Nedumudi Venu, Sharada and Parvathy in lead roles, while Devan, Innocent and Sankaradi play supporting roles. The film is about an elderly teacher couple, who bring up a girl with devotion — only to lose her as well as her son.

The film was jointly produced by M. G. Gopinath and Babu Thiruvalla under the banner of Symphony Creations, in their first production venture. They would go on to produce the classic Amaram (1991). The film was distributed by Jubilee Productions. The film features original songs composed by Johnson, with lyrics written by O. N. V. Kurup. The cinematography of the film was done by Vasant Kumar, while the editing and art direction was done by Bharathan himself.

Oru Minnaminuginte Nurunguvettam was released on 2 March 1987 to widespread critical acclaim. The film was a commercial success and was declared a hit at the box office. The film won two Kerala State Film Awards - Best Actor for Nedumudi Venu and Best Film with Popular Appeal and Aesthetic Value. The film also won two Filmfare Awards South - Best Actor for Nedumudi Venu and Best Actress for Sharada. Nedumudi Venu's performance in the film is considered by critics to be one of finest and most memorable performances in his career.

Plot
The film narrates story of a Malayali couple, Ravunni Nair (Nedumudi Venu) and Saraswathi Amma (Sharada), who were colleagues teaching in the same school who eventually married, when the former was 45 and the latter was 40. The greatest sorrow of their life is that they are childless. After retirement, Maya (Parvathy) comes to stay with them. She was a friend's daughter with whom Saraswathi Amma had stayed during her earlier teaching career. Maya has a place at a local college and is in search of a place for boarding and lodging as well as guardians. Maya, motherless for long, brings with her some cheer. The old couple almost adopt her as their daughter and Maya reciprocates.

Ravi was in love with Maya. He returns from the United States to meet her. Maya's father Bhadran Nampoothiripadu does not approve of Ravi. However, Ravunni and Saraswathi Amma bless Ravi and Maya and they are married. Ravi has to go back to America and he leaves Maya with the couple as she is now expectinga baby. She gives birth to a baby boy but dies in child-birth. The couple lose a major prop of their lives. They are left with the baby, who they look after like their own grandson. Ravi returns to get his son and now the other prop is also gone. They console each other and comfort themselves to live the rest of their lives.

Cast
 Nedumudi Venu as Ravunni Nair
 Sharada as Saraswathi Amma
 Parvathy as Maya
 Devan as Ravi
 M. S. Thripunithura as Bhadran Nampoothiripadu
 Innocent as Parameswaran Nair
 Sankaradi as Menon
 Master Vinu

Soundtrack

Reception
In a retrospect review of the film, Neelima Menon of The News Minute states that: "Oru Minnaminunginte Nurunguvettam is one of the finest collaborations between Bharathan and John Paul. Even though at the helm are an aging couple, one cannot remember a more intense love story in Malayalam cinema. This is love in all its fragility, humility and acceptance. It’s about equality and giving. It’s about understanding each other with a mere glance. It’s about fights, laughter, misgivings and loads of undiluted love. If John Paul creates a pristine village setting for the couple to flourish and age like fine wine, Bharathan, with his magical artistry breathes life into the characters and makes us desperately fall in love with them." She further goes on to state that "Oru Minnaminunginte Nurunguvettam is one of the most beautiful love stories of all time."

The Hindu in an article praises Nedumudi Venu's and Sharda's performances in the film stating that: "In Bharathan’s beautiful film about an ageing couple, both former school teachers, Venu and Sharada were outstanding. It was another reminder of his versatility as an actor."

The News Minute praises Nedumudi Venu's performance in the film stating that: "Nedumudi must have played more aged characters than any of his contemporaries at one period. In this 1987 film, when he is not even 40, he plays a retired old teacher, living with his retired teacher wife (Sharada). A childless couple, their anxieties grow when they suddenly find themselves playing guardian to a teenage girl (Parvathy) who comes to stay with them. Nedumudi plays the more anxious ‘parent’ and convincingly pulls off the tense, worried, short-tempered old man, getting easily agitated with just about everyone. It brought him a best actor award from the state."

Accolades
Kerala State Film Awards
 Best Film with Popular Appeal and Aesthetic Value - Bharathan and Babu Thiruvalla
 Kerala State Film Awards - Best Actor - Nedumudi Venu
Filmfare Awards South
 Filmfare Awards South for Best Actor - Nedumudi Venu
 Filmfare Awards South for Best Actress - Sharada

References

External links
 

1987 films
1980s Malayalam-language films
1987 drama films
Films directed by Bharathan